The thirteenth season of the American animated television series The Simpsons originally aired on the Fox network between November 6, 2001, and May 22, 2002 and consists of 22 episodes. The showrunner for the thirteenth production season was Al Jean, who executive-produced 17 episodes. Mike Scully executive-produced the remaining five, which were all hold-overs that were produced for the previous season. The Simpsons is an animated series about an American family, which consists of Homer, Marge, Bart, Lisa, and Maggie. The show is set in the fictional city of Springfield, and lampoons American culture, society, television and many aspects of the human condition. This is also the last season to use cel animation.

The season won an Annie Award for Best Animated Television Production, and was nominated for several other awards, including two Primetime Emmy Awards, three Writers Guild of America Awards, and an Environmental Media Award. The Simpsons ranked 30th in the season ratings with an average viewership of 12.4 million viewers. It was the second-highest-rated show on Fox after Malcolm in the Middle. Season 13 was released on DVD in Region 1 on August 24, 2010, Region 2 on September 20, 2010, and Region 4 on December 1, 2010.

Production
Mike Scully served as executive producer for the show for seasons nine to twelve. Five of the episodes produced for season 12 were held over and aired as part of the thirteenth season. He left the show following season 12 and was replaced by Al Jean. Jean was one of the original writers for The Simpsons, and served as executive producer of the third and fourth seasons with Mike Reiss before leaving the show in 1993. Jean returned full-time to The Simpsons during the tenth season (1998), this time without Reiss. Jean called it "a great job with a lot of responsibility," and cited "the fact that people love it so much" as "great".

Writers credited with episodes in the thirteenth season included Joel H. Cohen, John Frink, Don Payne, Carolyn Omine, George Meyer, Mike Scully, Dana Gould, John Swartzwelder, Ian Maxtone-Graham, Matt Selman, Tim Long, Jon Vitti, Matt Warburton, Deb Lacusta and cast member Dan Castellaneta. Freelance writers included Bill Freiberger. Animation directors included Bob Anderson, Mike B. Anderson, Mark Kirkland, Jen Kamerman, Lance Kramer, Nancy Kruse, Lauren MacMullan, Michael Marcantel, Pete Michels, Steven Dean Moore, Matthew Nastuk, Michael Polcino, Jim Reardon and Chuck Sheetz. 

The main cast consisted of Dan Castellaneta (Homer Simpson, Grampa Simpson, Krusty the Clown among others), Julie Kavner (Marge Simpson), Nancy Cartwright (Bart Simpson, Ralph Wiggum, Nelson Muntz), Yeardley Smith (Lisa Simpson), Hank Azaria (Moe Szyslak, Apu, Chief Wiggum, among others) and Harry Shearer (Ned Flanders, Mr. Burns, Principal Skinner, among others). Other cast members included Marcia Wallace (Edna Krabappel), Pamela Hayden (Milhouse Van Houten, among others), Tress MacNeille (Agnes Skinner, among others), Russi Taylor (Martin Prince) and Karl Wiedergott (additional characters).

Release

Critical reception
Some critics felt season 13 was an improvement over the previous Scully seasons. DVDDizzy rhetorically asked how the season "stand[s] up for someone just looking to jump into a full, semi-recent year of episodes", answering "Pretty darn well". It explained "Nearly everything that makes "The Simpsons" what it is can be found here. Most important is the large cast of Springfield residents used to perfection...Clearly, real thought and lots of it goes into each episode's creation", and added "it's almost miraculous how fresh and sharp "The Simpsons" remains in its thirteenth year on air". The site explained "Not every moment here is brilliant. After a rocky start, the season really hits its groove a few episodes in. Even though jokes don't always land, there are guaranteed to be at least a few amusing moments per episode. The stylings haven't changed all that much. There are tasteful homages and cultural references, including loving parodies of classic movies, television, and literature [and] as usual, tons of famous guest stars lend their voices, some as themselves and others as fictional characters". Adam Rayner of WhatCulture wrote that "Season thirteen represents a time when the show was clinging to the classic humour that was derived from situations that were rooted in a reality—albeit a heightened reality—which could happen to you and your family, while slowly descending into the surreal and farcical." Matt Wheeldon of GoodFilmGuide said "the 13th Season another solid, and fairly memorable, effort from the world's best loved cartoon; even if it isn't the be all and end all of Simpsons cartooning. DVD Talk's Ryan Keefer gave a season 3.5/5 stars and said "While Jean might not have brought things to previous glory, he certainly righted the ship in Season 13." Blu-Ray.com gave season 13 a 3.5/5 and Casey Broadwater's sentiment was "The hit-to-miss ratio is much better here than in the previous three seasons, and while the episodes are never quite as hilarious as the Simpsons of old—from way back in the early 1990s—season 13 does mark a turning point for the series." Ron Martin of 411 Mania was more critical giving the season a 6.5/10. Part of the verdict was "Season 13 is representative of the chaotic scatterbrained nature the show would take on from here on out." Casey Burchby of DVD Talk gave the season a 3/5 and wrote "the thirteenth season is further proof of the regrettable change in comic tone that the series took on in the early part of the last decade."

Awards and nominations

In 2002, The Simpsons won its eleventh consecutive Annie Award for Best Animated Television Production.

"She of Little Faith" was nominated for the Primetime Emmy Award for Outstanding Animated Program (For Programming less than One Hour). The song "Ode to Branson" from "The Old Man and the Key" by Alf Clausen and Jon Vitti was nominated for Outstanding Individual Achievement in Music and Lyrics. "Brawl in the Family" was nominated for the Environmental Media Award for Best Television Episodic Comedy. Three episodes were nominated for the Writers Guild of America Award in the animation category: "Blame It on Lisa" (written by Bob Bendetson), "The Bart Wants What It Wants" (written by John Frink and Don Payne) and "Jaws Wired Shut" (written by Matt Selman). The award was won by the Futurama episode "Godfellas". It marked the only time since the introduction of the category that a show other than The Simpsons won the award.

In 2003, the show was the first and only animated program to be nominated for a Golden Globe Award, for Best Television Series – Musical or Comedy, which it lost to Curb Your Enthusiasm.

Episodes

Blu-ray and DVD release
The DVD and Blu-ray box set for season thirteen was released by 20th Century Fox Home Entertainment in the United States and Canada on Tuesday, August 24, 2010, eight years after it had completed broadcast on television. As well as every episode from the season, the Blu-ray and DVD releases feature bonus material including deleted scenes, animatics, and commentaries for every episode. The box art features Ralph Wiggum, and a special limited-edition "embossed head case" package was also released. The Blu-ray set is also available on Region 4. In Region 2, the set is only available on DVD.

References

Bibliography

External links
 Season 13 at TheSimpsons.com
 Season 13 at the Internet Movie Database

Simpsons season 13
2001 American television seasons
2002 American television seasons